Demetrio Angola Landeveris (born June 22, 1965 in Coripata) is a Bolivian retired football striker.

Club career
He started his career at Bolívar but spent most of his career playing for Club Jorge Wilstermann.

International career
Angola played at the 1995 Copa América for the Bolivia national team. He wore the No.7 shirt and scored a goal against Argentina in a 2-1 defeat in the first round. He represented his country in 3 FIFA World Cup qualification matches.

Personal life
Angola now is a senior officer in the Bolivian Naval Force. He is married to Patricia Antezana Ovando and has two children.

References

External links

1965 births
Living people
People from Nor Yungas Province
Association football forwards
Bolivian footballers
Bolivia international footballers
Club Bolívar players
The Strongest players
C.D. Jorge Wilstermann players
Club San José players
1995 Copa América players
Bolivian people of Greek descent